Ipelates is a genus of primitive carrion beetles in the family Agyrtidae. There are at least four described species in Ipelates.

Species
These four species belong to the genus Ipelates:
 Ipelates kerneggeri Perkovsky, 2005
 Ipelates latissimus (Reitter, 1884)
 Ipelates latus (Mannerheim, 1852)
 Ipelates weitshati Perkovsky, 2007

References

Further reading

 

Staphylinoidea
Articles created by Qbugbot